Ayton railway station was a station which served the village of Ayton in the Scottish area of Scottish Borders. It was located on what is now known as the East Coast Main Line.

History 
Opened by the North Eastern Railway, it became part of the London and North Eastern Railway during the Grouping of 1923. The station then passed on to the Scottish Region of British Railways on nationalisation in 1948.

The station was closed by British Railways in 1962.

References

Notes

Sources 
 
 
 
 Station on navigable O.S. map

External links 
 Ayton station on navigable 1947 O. S. map
 RAILSCOT on Berwickshire Railway
 RAILSCOT on North British Railway 
 

Disused railway stations in the Scottish Borders
Railway stations in Great Britain opened in 1846
Railway stations in Great Britain closed in 1962
Former North British Railway stations
1846 establishments in Scotland